The Nehru Memorial Museum & Library (NMML) is a museum and library in New Delhi, India, which aims to preserve and reconstruct the history of the Indian independence movement. Housed within the Teen Murti House complex, it is an autonomous institution under the Indian Ministry of Culture, and was founded in 1964 after the death of India's first prime minister, Jawaharlal Nehru. It aims to foster academic research on modern and contemporary history. Today, the Nehru Memorial Library is the world's leading resource centre on India's first prime minister. Its archives contain the bulk of Mahatma Gandhi's writings, as well as private papers of Swami Sahajanand Saraswati, C. Rajagopalachari, B. C. Roy, Jayaprakash Narayan, Charan Singh, Sarojini Naidu and Rajkumari Amrit Kaur. In March 2010 it launched a digitization project of its archives, and by June 2011, 867,000 pages of manuscripts and 29,807 photographs had been scanned and 500,000 pages had been uploaded on the digital library website. Amongst noted publications of the NMML are Selected Works of Jawaharlal Nehru, Man of Destiny by Ruskin Bond, and Nehru Anthology (1980).

Nehru Memorial Museum & Library has over the years supported scholars and historians across India. Through its fellowship programme, the Nehru Memorial Fellowship, it has funded some of India's best academics such as Chief Information Commissioner OP Kejriwal. It is also one of the best libraries in Delhi for the social sciences as it has a huge collection on labour related issues in the form of PhD dissertations, reports, books, journals and newspapers.

On 26 April 2016, a dagger gifted to former prime minister Jawaharlal Nehru by Saudi Arabia was stolen from the Nehru Memorial Museum and Library.

Overview

Nehru Memorial Museum and Library is known as Teen Murti Bhawan (sculptor: Leonard Jennings of Britain), after the three statues established in 1922 in honor of the three Indian princely states Jodhpur, Hyderabad and Mysore after their contribution in World War I by serving in the present day Gaza Strip, Israel, and Palestine. It was designed by Robert Tor Russell who also designed Connaught Place and a few parts of Janpath. Spread over 30 acres, its construction started in 1929 and took around one year to completion. It is a masterpiece of British and French architecture and woodwork. Initially known as Flagstaff House, it was used by British forces as the residence of the Commander-in-Chief. After Independence, the house was taken over as the residence of Jawaharlal Nehru (1889–1964), first Prime Minister of India. After his death in 1964, it was decided that Teen Murti Bhawan should be converted into a museum and a library which would promote original research in modern Indian history with special reference to the Nehruvian era. It was inaugurated on his birth anniversary, 14 November that year, by then President Sarvepalli Radhakrishnan.

Nehru Memorial Museum and Library Society was formed on 1 April 1966. Initially, the museum was set up in the eastern wing and the library in the western wing of the sprawling building, with Bal Ram Nanda as its founder-director, who also curated the museum and library for next 17 years. He received the Padma Vibhushan in 2003.

With the passage of time and the rapid growth of research material in the library, more space was required and an exclusive library building was constructed. It was formally inaugurated by President V. V. Giri in January 1974. However, the steady increase in the volume of material required for research further necessitated the construction of an annex building which was completed in 1989. The Centre for Contemporary Studies was set up in this building as a new unit in 1990.

To commemorate the Foundation Day of the Nehru Memorial Museum and Library, it organises an annual lecture on 1 April, called the Jawaharlal Nehru Memorial Foundation Day Lecture. Nehru Planetarium is also part of NMML. Much work is also happening in the field of connecting people with this place with special reference to children, who are considered to be closest to Jawaharlal Nehru's heart, earning the popular name 'Chacha Nehru'. The library also has an archive of the private correspondence between Nehru and Edwina Mountbatten, wife of Lord Mountbatten, but with limited access.

The Centre for Contemporary Studies was set up as an advanced studies unit of NMML in 1990 and is housed in the Annexe building. NMML took over the charge of the Nehru Planetarium from the Jawaharlal Nehru Memorial Fund in 2005.

From April 2015 to March 2016, the Museum received nearly 1.7 million visitors.

Nehru Memorial digital library
The collection of manuscripts, historical documents and other archival materials of the Nehru Memorial Museum and Library were made available online, after the digitisation project, with the help of HCL Infosystems started in 2010. By May 2011, employing the Rs union Ministry of Culture funding of Rs. 10 crore, the project had digitized 50 collections of manuscripts, 834 interview transcripts, 29,802 photographs, over one lakh images of the newspaper Amrita Bazar Patrika (1905–1938). In all, the digitization will cover nine million documents and was to be completed by 2015.

Pradhanmantri Sangrahalaya
Nehru Memorial Museum and Library is now invigorated with the opening of The Pradhanmantri Sangrahalaya as its part in April 2022. The Pradhan Mantri Sangrahalaya is a tribute to every Prime Minister of India since Independence, and a narrative record of how each one has contributed to the development of our nation over the last 75 years. It is a history of collective effort, and powerful evidence of the creative success of India's democracy. Our Prime Ministers came from every class and tier of society, for the gates of democracy were equally open to all. Each one left an important footprint on the journey of development, social harmony and economic empowerment that has enabled India to give true meaning to freedom. We inherited an impoverished land from the debris of British colonialism, and together gave it a new life, lifting our country from famished deprivation to food-surplus status, and creating infrastructure over barren territory for the benefit of the people.  The Teen Murti Estate, home to India's first Prime Minister Shri Jawaharlal Nehru for 16 years, was the natural environment for Pradhan Mantri Sangrahalaya, because this is a story of continuity. The Sangrahalaya is a seamless blend which begins at the renovated and refurbished Nehru Museum building, now completely updated and technologically advanced displays on the life and contribution of Shri Jawaharlal Nehru. The new panorama includes a section which exhibits a large number of rare gifts received by him from all over the world but never put on display.

The saga of modern India starts with the freedom struggle and the making of a great Constitution. The Sangrahalaya goes on to tell the story of how our Prime Ministers navigated the nation through various challenges and ensured the all-round progress of the country. Within this story is a message for the younger generation: there are greater horizons to conquer as we transform India into New India.

Controversy

In 2009, several well-known academics such as Ramachandra Guha, Sumit Sarkar, Nivedita Menon, Nayanjot Lahiri, Mushirul Hasan, Mukul Kesavan, Mahesh Rangarajan and Krishna Kumar, alleged that the institution was being run in an inefficient and corrupt fashion. They pointed out that NMML had discontinued its publication programme, and that the acquisition of manuscripts and oral histories had all but come to a halt. In turn, writer and activist Madhu Kishwar, environmentalist Pradeep Kishen and historians Irfan Habib and D. N. Jha came out in support of NMML and its director Mridula Mukherjee.

References

External links
Nehru Memorial Museum & Library
https://www.pmsangrahalaya.gov.in/

Buildings and structures in New Delhi
Museums in Delhi
Libraries in Delhi
Indian digital libraries
Academic libraries in India
1964 establishments in Delhi
Archives in India
Biographical museums in India
Monuments and memorials to Jawaharlal Nehru
Library buildings completed in 1989
Libraries established in 1964
20th-century architecture in India